Islam is the most practiced religion in Turkey. The established presence of Islam in the region that now constitutes modern Turkey dates back to the later half of the 11th century, when the Seljuks started expanding into eastern Anatolia.

According to the government, 99.8% of the Turkish population is Muslim since traditional non-Muslim ethnic groups of Turkey (such as Jews, Armenians and Greeks) don't consist more than 0.2%, although some surveys give a slightly lower estimate of 96.2%, with the most popular school of thought (maddhab) being the Hanafi school of Sunni Islam (about 90% of the overall Muslim denominations). The remaining Muslim sects forming about 9% of the overall Muslim population consist of Alevis, Ja'faris (representing 1%) and Alawites (with an estimated population of around 1 million) which is about 1% of the overall Muslim population in Turkey.There are also a minority of Sufi and non-denominational Muslims.

According to religiosity poll conducted in Turkey in 2019 by OPTİMAR, 89.5% of the population identifies as Muslim, 4.5% believed in God but did not belong to an organized religion, 2.7% were agnostic, 1.7% were atheist, 0.5% belonged to other religions, and 1.1% did not give an answer.

History

Islamic empires 

During the Muslim conquests of the 7th and early 8th centuries, Arab armies established the Islamic Empire. The Islamic Golden Age was soon inaugurated by the middle of the 8th century by the ascension of the Abbasid Caliphate and the transfer of the capital from Damascus to Baghdad.

The later period saw initial expansion and the capture of Crete (840). The Abbasids soon shifted their attention towards the East. During the later fragmentation of the Abbasid rule and the rise of their Shiite rivals the Fatimids and Buyids, a resurgent Byzantium recaptured Crete and Cilicia in 961, Cyprus in 965, and pushed into the Levant by 975. The Byzantines successfully contested with the Fatimids for influence in the region until the arrival of the Seljuk Turks who first allied with the Abbasids and then ruled as the de facto rulers.

In 1068 Alp Arslan and allied Turkoman tribes recaptured many Abbasid lands and even invaded Byzantine regions, pushing further into eastern and central Anatolia after a major victory at the Battle of Manzikert in 1071. The disintegration of the Seljuk dynasty resulted in the rise of subsequent, smaller, rival Turkic kingdoms such as the Danishmends, the Sultanate of Rum, and various Atabegs who contested the control of the region during the Crusades and incrementally expanded across Anatolia until the rise of the Ottoman Empire.

Ottoman Caliphate 

Beginning in the twelfth century, new waves of Turkic migrants many of whom belonged to Sufi orders, some of which later incorporated heterodox beliefs. One Sufi order that appealed to Turks on Anatolia after 1300 was the Safaviyya, an order that was originally Sunni and non-political but later became both Shi'a and politically based in northwest Iran. During the fourteenth and fifteenth centuries, the Safavid and similar orders such as the Bektaşi became rivals of the Ottomans—who were orthodox Sunni Muslims—for political control of eastern Anatolia. Although the Bektaşi order became accepted as a sect of orthodox Sunni Muslims, they did not abandon their heterodox beliefs. In contrast, the Safavids eventually conquered Iran, shed their heterodox religious beliefs, and became proponents of orthodox Twelver Shi'a Islam.
The conquest of the Byzantine capital of Constantinople (modern day Istanbul) in 1453 enabled the Ottomans to consolidate their empire in Anatolia and Thrace. The Ottomans later revived the title of caliph during the reign of Sultan Selim. Despite the absence of a formal institutional structure, Sunni religious functionaries played an important political role. Justice was dispensed by religious courts; in theory, the codified system of şeriat regulated all aspects of life, at least for the Muslim subjects of the empire. The head of the judiciary ranked directly below the sultan and was second in power only to the grand vizier. Early in the Ottoman period, the office of grand mufti of Istanbul evolved into that of Şeyhülislam (shaykh, or "leader of Islam"), which had ultimate jurisdiction over all the courts in the empire and consequently exercised authority over the interpretation and application of şeriat. Legal opinions pronounced by the Şeyhülislam were considered definitive interpretations.

Secularization era 

The secularization of Turkey started in the society during the last years of the Ottoman Empire and it was the most prominent and most controversial feature of Atatürk's reforms. Under his leadership, the caliphate—the supreme politico-religious office of Sunni Islam, and symbol of the sultan's claim to world leadership of all Muslims—was abolished. The secular power of the religious authorities and functionaries was reduced and eventually eliminated. The religious foundations were nationalized, and religious education was restricted and for a time prohibited. The influential and popular mystical orders of the dervish brotherhoods (Tariqa) also were suppressed.

Republic period: 1923–present 

The withdrawal of Turkey, heir to the Ottoman Empire, as the presumptive leader of the world Muslim community was symbolic of the change in the government's relationship to Islam. Indeed, secularism (or laiklik) became one of the "Kemalist ideology" of Mustafa Kemal Atatürk's anti-clerical program for remaking Turkey. Whereas Islam had formed the identity of Muslims within the Ottoman Empire, secularism was seen as molding the new Turkish nation and its citizens.

Atatürk's Reforms 

In 1922 the new nationalist regime abolished the Ottoman sultanate, and in 1924 it abolished the caliphate, the religious office that Ottoman sultans had held for four centuries. Thus, for the first time in Islamic history, no ruler claimed spiritual leadership of Islam.

Atatürk and his associates not only abolished certain religious practices and institutions but also questioned the value of religion, preferring to place their trust in science. They regarded organized religion as an anachronism and contrasted it unfavorably with "civilization", which to them meant a rationalist, secular culture. Establishment of secularism in Turkey was not, as it had been in the West, a gradual process of separation of church and state. In the Ottoman Empire, all spheres of life, at least theoretically, had been subject to traditional religious law, and Sunni religious organizations had been part of the state structure. However, usually state had authority over the clergy and religious law, even at the Ottoman period (e.g.many Sultans are known to change Şeyhülislams, who do not approve state politics). When the reformers of the early 1920s opted for a secular state, they removed religion from the sphere of public policy and restricted it exclusively to that of personal morals, behavior, and faith. Although private observance of religious rituals could continue, religion and religious organization were excluded from public life.

The policies directly affecting religion were numerous and sweeping. In addition to the abolition of the caliphate, new laws mandated abolition of the office of Şeyhülislam; abolition of the religious hierarchy; the closing and confiscation of Sufi lodges, meeting places, and monasteries and the outlawing of their rituals and meetings; establishment of government control over the vakıfs, which had been inalienable under Sharia; replacement of sharia with adapted European legal codes; the closing of religious schools; abandonment of the Islamic calendar in favor of the Gregorian calendar used in the West; restrictions on public attire that had religious associations, with the fez outlawed for men and the veil discouraged for women; and the outlawing of the traditional garb of local religious leaders.

Atatürk and his colleagues also attempted to Turkify Islam through official encouragement of such practices as using Turkish rather than Arabic at devotions, substituting the Turkish word Tanrı for the Arabic word Allah, and introducing Turkish for the daily calls to prayer. These changes in devotional practices deeply disturbed many Muslims and caused widespread resentment, which led in 1950 to a return to the Arabic version of the call to prayer, after the opposition party DP won the elections. Of longer-lasting effect were the regime's measures prohibiting religious education, restricting the building of new mosques, and transferring existing mosques to secular purposes. Most notably, the Hagia Sophia (Justinian's sixth-century Christian basilica, which had been converted into a mosque by Mehmet II) was made a museum in 1935. The effect of these changes was to make religion, or more correctly Islam, subject to the control of the state. Muftis and imams (prayer leaders) were appointed by the government, and religious instruction was taken over by the Ministry of National Education. As a result of these policies, the Turkish Republic was judged negatively by some sections of the Muslim world.

The expectation of the secular ruling elite that the policies of the 1920s and 1930s would diminish the role of religion in public life did not materialize. As early as 1925, religious grievances were one of the principal causes of the Şeyh Sait rebellion, an uprising in southeastern Turkey that may have claimed as many as 30,000 lives before being suppressed.

Although Turkey was secularized at the official level, religion remained a strong force. After 1950 some political leaders tried to benefit from popular attachment to religion by espousing support for programs and policies that appealed to the religiously inclined. Such efforts were opposed by most of the state elite, who believed that secularism was an essential principle of Kemalist Ideology. This disinclination to appreciate religious values and beliefs gradually led to a polarization of society. The polarization became especially evident in the 1980s as a new generation of educated but religiously motivated local leaders emerged to challenge the dominance of the secularized political elite. These new leaders have been assertively proud of Turkey's Islamic heritage and generally have been successful at adapting familiar religious idioms to describe dissatisfaction with various government policies. By their own example of piety, prayer, and political activism, they have helped to spark a revival of Islamic observance in Turkey. By 1994 slogans promising that a return to Islam would cure economic ills and solve the problems of bureaucratic inefficiencies had enough general appeal to enable avowed religious candidates to win mayoral elections in Istanbul and Ankara, the country's two largest cities.

Multiparty Period 
Following the relaxation of authoritarian political controls in 1946, large numbers of people began to call openly for a return to traditional religious practice. During the 1950s, even certain political leaders found it expedient to join religious leaders in advocating more state respect for religion.

A more direct manifestation of the growing reaction against secularism was the revival of the Sufi brotherhoods. Not only did suppressed Sufi orders such as the Kadiri, Mevlevi, Nakşibendi, Khālidiyyā and Al-Ṭarīqah al-Tijāniyyah reemerge, but new movements were formed, including the Nur Cemaati, Gülen movement, Sülaymānīyyā, Community of İskenderpaşa and İsmailağa. The Tijāni became especially militant in confronting the state. For example, Tijāni damaged monuments to Atatürk to symbolize their opposition to his policy of secularization. This was however a very isolated incident and only involved one particular Sheikh of the order. Throughout the 1950s, there were numerous trials of Ticani and other Sufi leaders for antistate activities. Simultaneously, however, some movements, notably the Süleymancı and Nurcular, cooperated with those politicians perceived as supportive of pro-Islamic policies. The Nurcular eventually advocated support for Turkey's multiparty political system, and one of its offshoots, the Gülen movement, had supported the True Path Party while the Işıkçılar and Enver Ören had openly supported the Motherland Party since the mid-1980s.

The demand for restoration of religious education in public schools began in the late 1940s. The government initially responded by authorizing religious instruction in state schools for those students whose parents requested it. Under Democrat Party rule during the 1950s, religious education was made compulsory in secondary schools unless parents made a specific request to have their children excused. Religious education was made compulsory for all primary and secondary school children in 1982.

Inevitably, the reintroduction of religion into the school curriculum raised the question of religious higher education. The secular elites, who tended to distrust traditional religious leaders, believed that Islam could be "reformed" if future leaders were trained in state-controlled seminaries. To further this goal, the government in 1949 established a faculty of divinity at Ankara University to train teachers of Islam and imams. In 1951 the Democrat Party government set up special secondary schools (İmam Hatip schools) for the training of imams and preachers. Initially, the imam hatip schools grew very slowly, but their numbers expanded rapidly to more than 250 during the 1970s, when the pro-Islam National Salvation Party participated in coalition governments. Following the 1980 coup, the military, although secular in orientation, viewed religion as an effective means to counter socialist ideas and thus authorized the construction of ninety more İmam Hatip high schools.

During the 1970s and 1980s, Islam experienced a kind of political rehabilitation because right-of-center secular leaders perceived religion as a potential bulwark in their ideological struggle with left-of-center secular leaders. A small advocacy group that became extremely influential was the Hearth of Intellectuals (Aydınlar Ocağı), an organization that maintains that true Turkish culture is a synthesis of the Turks' pre-Islamic traditions and Islam. According to the Hearth, Islam not only constitutes an essential aspect of Turkish culture but is a force that can be regulated by the state to help socialize the people to be obedient citizens acquiescent to the overall secular order. After the 1980 military coup, many of the Hearth's proposals for restructuring schools, colleges, and state broadcasting were adopted. The result was a purge from these state institutions of more than 2,000 intellectuals perceived as espousing leftist ideas incompatible with the Hearth's vision of Turkey's national culture.

The state's more tolerant attitude toward Islam encouraged the proliferation of private religious activities, including the construction of new mosques and Qur'an schools in the cities, the establishment of Islamic centers for research on and conferences about Islam and its role in Turkey, and the establishment of religiously oriented professional and women's journals. The printing of newspapers, the publication of religious books, and the growth of innumerable religious projects ranging from health centers, child-care facilities, and youth hostels to financial institutions and consumer cooperatives flourished. When the government legalized private broadcasting after 1990, several Islamic radio stations were organized. In the summer of 1994, the first Islamic television station, Kanal 7, began broadcasting, first in Istanbul and subsequently in Ankara.

Although the tarikah (the term can sometimes be used to refer to any 'group or sect' some of whom may not even be Muslim) have played a seminal role in Turkey's religious revival and in the mid-1990s still published several of the country's most widely circulated religious journals and newspapers, a new phenomenon, İslamcı Aydın (the Islamist intellectual) unaffiliated with the traditional Sufi orders, emerged during the 1980s. Prolific and popular writers such as Ali Bulaç, Rasim Özdenören, and İsmet Özel have drawn upon their knowledge of Western philosophy, Marxist sociology, and radical Islamist political theory to advocate a modern Islamic perspective that does not hesitate to criticize genuine societal ills while simultaneously remaining faithful to the ethical values and spiritual dimensions of religion. Islamist intellectuals are harshly critical of Turkey's secular intellectuals, whom they fault for trying to do in Turkey what Western intellectuals did in Europe: substitute worldly materialism, in its capitalist or socialist version, for religious values.

On 15 July 2016, a coup d'état was attempted in Turkey against state institutions by a faction within the Turkish Armed Forces with connections to the Gülen movement, citing an erosion in secularism.

Status of religious freedom 

The Constitution provides for freedom of religion, and the Government generally respects this right in practice; however, the Government imposes some restrictions on all religious expression in government offices and state-run institutions, including universities, usually for the stated reason of preserving the secular state, and distance of state to all kinds of beliefs. The Constitution establishes the country as a secular state and provides for freedom of belief, freedom of worship, and the private dissemination of religious ideas. However, other constitutional provisions regarding the integrity and existence of the secular state restrict these rights. The secularity, bearing a meaning of a protection of believers, plays an important role to protect the state.

While most of the secular countries have religious schools and educational system, one in Turkey can only have religious teachings after a state decided age; which is considered as a necessity given the fact that Turkey is the only considerably secular country in the Muslim world, i.e. it is claimed that conditions to establish secularism on are different than those in Christian world. The establishment of private religious schools and universities (regardless of what religion) is forbidden. Only the state controlled Imam-Hatip high school is allowed which benefits only Islamic community in Turkey. This type of high schools teach religious subjects with modern positive science. However, graduates of these schools cannot go to the university to seek higher education in another field of study for example medicine, law, engineering etc.; because graduates of these schools are intended to be clerics, rather than being doctors or lawyers. With the rise of fundamentalism in schools, more than 370 Turkish schools have signed a political declaration by the High School Students Union of Turkey (TLB) in order to protest what they perceive as anti-secularism in schools. Accordingly, there has been a rise in voiced objections to the conversion of schools into an Imam-Hatip, which has affected many Turkish schools since 2012. Many parents have complained about the increasing pressure of schools to become an Imam-Hatip.

The Government oversees Muslim religious facilities and education through its Ministry of Religious Affairs (Diyanet İşleri Başkanlığı), which reports directly to the Prime Ministry. The Diyanet has responsibility for regulating the operation of the country's 75,000 registered mosques and employing local and provincial imams, who are civil servants. Some groups, particularly Alevis, claim that the Diyanet reflects mainstream Islamic beliefs to the exclusion of other beliefs. The government asserts that the Diyanet treats equally all who request services. However, Alevis do not utilize Mosques or the imams for their worship ceremonies. Alevi ceremonies take place in Cem Houses and led by Dedes who do not benefit from the large budget of the Religious Affairs.

Diyanet and secularism 

Reforms going in the direction of secularism have been completed under Atatürk (abolition of the caliphate, etc.).
However, Turkey is not strictly a secular state: 
there is no separation between religion and the state
there is a tutelage of religion by the state
However, each is free of his religious beliefs.

There is an administration called "Presidency of Religious Affairs" or Diyanet manages 77,500 mosques. This state agency, established by Atatürk (1924), finance only Sunni Muslim worship Other religions must ensure a financially self-sustaining running and they face administrative obstacles during operation.

The Diyanet is an official state institution established in 1924 and works to provide Quranic education for children, as well as drafting weekly sermons delivered to approximately 85,000 different mosques. Furthermore, the Diyanet employs all of the imams in Turkey.

When collecting tax, all Turkish citizens are equal. The tax rate is not based on religion. However, through the Diyanet, Turkish citizens are not equal in the use of revenue. The Presidency of Religious Affairs, which has a budget over U.S. $2.5 billion in 2012, finance only Sunni Muslim worship.

This situation presents a theological problem, insofar as Islam stipulates, through the notion of haram (Qur'an, Surah 6, verse 152), that we must "give full measure and full weight in all justice”.

Sufi orders like Alevi-Bektashi, Bayrami-Jelveti, Halveti (Gulshani, Jerrahi, Nasuhi, Rahmani, Sunbuli, Ussaki), Hurufi-Rüfai, Malamati, Mevlevi, Nakşibendi (Halidi, Haqqani), Qadiri-Galibi and Ja'fari Muslims are not officially recognized.

Headscarf issue 

Although intellectual debates on the role of Islam attracted widespread interest, they did not provoke the kind of controversy that erupted over the issue of appropriate attire for Muslim women. During the early 1980s, female college students who were determined to demonstrate their commitment to Islam began to cover their heads and necks with scarves and wear long, shape-concealing overcoats. The appearance of these women in the citadels of Turkish secularism shocked those men and women who tended to perceive such attire as a symbol of the Islamic traditionalism they rejected. Militant secularists persuaded the Higher Education Council to issue a regulation in 1987 forbidding female university students to cover their heads in class. Protests by thousands of religious students and some university professors forced several universities to waive enforcement of the dress code. The issue continued to be seriously divisive in the mid-1990s. Throughout the first half of the 1990s, highly educated, articulate but religiously pious women have appeared in public dressed in Islamic attire that conceals all but their faces and hands. Other women, especially in Ankara, Istanbul, and İzmir, have demonstrated against such attire by wearing revealing fashions and Atatürk badges. The issue is discussed and debated in almost every type of forum – artistic, commercial, cultural, economic, political, and religious. For many citizens of Turkey, women's dress has become the issue that defines whether a Muslim is secularist or religious. In 2010, the Turkish Higher Educational council (YÖK) lifted the ban on headscarves at the universities. Since the start of his presidency, President Recep Tayyip Erdogan has drastically increased the amount of religious high schools across Turkey to support his plan on bringing up a more pious generation. However, this push on piousness in school children seems to have had an adverse effect, for there is anecdotal evidence of a notable amount of Turkish students from religious high schools admitting their loss of faith in Islamic beliefs, which has caused substantial amount of discussion among politicians and religious clerics.

More recently in 2016, Turkey approved hijab as the part of the official police uniform. For the first time, female officers will be able to cover their heads with a headscarf under their police caps. This act was pushed by President Recep Tayyip Erdogan's Islamist-rooted Justice and Development Party (AKP) that have been pushing for relaxed restrictions on the hijab.

Denominations

Sunni Islam

The vast majority of the present-day Turkish people are Muslim and the Sunni Islam is the most populous Islamic sect, comprising about %90 of the Muslims in the country. The most popular school of law is the Hanafite madh'hab of Sunni Islam. The Hanafi madhhab was the official school of Islamic jurisprudence espoused by the Ottoman Empire and a 2013 survey conducted by the Turkish Directorate of Religious Affairs indicates that 77.5 percent of Turkish Muslims identify themselves as Hanafis. Another common Sunni jurisprudence, Shafi'i is the dominant one in Turkish Kurdistan. Although the Maturidi and Ash'ari schools of Islamic theology (which apply Ilm al-Kalam or rational thought to understand the Quran and the hadith) have been the dominant creeds in Turkey due to their widespread acceptance and propagation since the beginning of the Ottoman Empire, the Athari (literalist) creed of the Salafi movement has seen increasing acceptance.

Compared to the Hanbali school of Islam, the Hanafi school of Islam takes a much more liberal take on the religion, allowing for a more lenient interpretation of religious law.

The Sunni Islamic faith has continuously been a domineering faith since 661. The name Sunni originates from the emphasis of importance on the Sunna, which is related to the establishment of the Shari'a laws.

In Turkey, Muhammad is often called "Hazret-i Muhammed" or "Peygamber Efendimiz" (Our Prophet).

Shia Islam

Twelver branch of Shia Islam Muslim population of Turkey is composed of Ja'fari aqidah and fiqh, Batiniyya-Sufism aqidah of Maymūn’al-Qāddāhī fiqh of the Alevīs, and Cillī aqidah of Maymūn ibn Abu’l-Qāsim Sulaiman ibn Ahmad ibn at-Tabarānī fiqh of the Alawites, who altogether constitutes nearly one tenth of the whole population of the country. An estimate for the Turkish Alevi population varies from 3.5 million to 11 million. However it's so hard to estimate a realistic number for Shia population in Turkey since the country doesn't conduct ethnic or religious censuses.

Unlike the common usage of the term "Shi'a" in other languages, Aleviler instead is being frequently used to represent all the Shi'a Muslim sects in Turkish language. Furthermore, the term Kızılbaş in the history was used pejoratively for all Shi'ites in Anatolia.

Alevis

Estimates for Alevi population vary from less than 4 million to more than 25 million according to different sources. It's hard to make a realistic estimate for their population since the Turkish government has never asked about religious denominations in conducted censuses. Other reasons for this are the secular tendencies of the Alevi population and oppression by Sunni Islamists, which causes most Alevis to hide their religious identity. However, considering the few conducted reliable surveys, ~10% can be taken as a simplistic estimation. Some people use the term Alevi to refer all Shia Muslims in Turkey since they are the dominant Shia sect in the country.
 The Alevi ʿaqīdah 

Some of their members (or sub-groups, especially those belonging to Qizilbash and Hurufism) claim that God takes abode in the bodies of the human-beings (ḥulūl), believe in metempsychosis (tanāsukh),
Some of the Alevis criticize the course of Islam as it is being practiced overwhelmingly by more than 99% of Sunni and Shia population.
Regular daily salat and fasting in the holy month of Ramadan are not officially done by the Qizilbashs, Hurufis, and Ishikist groups. These members of Yazdânism like Ishikists and Yarsanis who portrayed themselves as Alevis, are frequently denounced by the Dedes.

Ja'faris

The followers of the Ja'fari jurisprudence constitute the third sizable community. It is historically the primary denomination of ethnic Azerbaijani people. Most of them lives in the eastern provinces neighboring to Azerbaijan, more particularly in the Iğdır Province and Kars Province, but also larger cities in the west. Considering the population of their historical homeland, it can be simplistically said that they constitute up to 1 million people in Turkey. They have 70 mosques in Istanbul and some 300 throughout the country and receive no state funding for their mosques and imams as the Presidency of Religious Affairs (Diyanet) is exclusively Sunni.

Alawites

The majority of the Alawite community in Turkey with an estimated population of around 1 million lives in the Province of Hatay, where they nearly represent half of the total population,
primarily in the districts of Arsuz, Defne and Samandağ, where Alawites constitute the majority and in Iskenderun and Antakya where they constitute a significant minority of the population.
Larger Alawite communities can also be found in the Çukurova region, mostly in and around the cities of Adana, Tarsus and Mersin. They are known as Arab Alevis by Turkish people.

Sufism

Folk Islam in Turkey has derived many of its popular practices from Sufism which has good presence in Turkey and Egypt. Particular Sufi shaikhs – and occasionally other individuals reputed to be pious – were regarded after death as saints having special powers. Veneration of saints (both male and female) and pilgrimages to their shrines and graves represent an important aspect of popular Islam in the country. Folk Islam has continued to embrace such practices although the veneration of saints officially has been discouraged since the 1930s. Plaques posted in various sanctuaries forbid the lighting of candles, the offering of votive objects, and related devotional activities in these places. Modern day Sufi shaykhs with large adherents in Turkey include Shaykh Mehmet Efendi (residing in Istanbul) and Mawlana Sheikh Nazim Al-Haqqani who resided in Lefka, North Cyprus, until his death in May, 2014.

Quranism

Those who do not accept the authority of hadith, known as Quranists, Quraniyoon, or Ahl al-Quran, are also present in Turkey. In Turkey, Quranist ideas became particularly noticeable, with portions of the youth either leaving Islam or converting to Quranism. There has been significant Quranist scholarship in Turkey, with there being even Quranist theology professors in significant universities, including scholars like Yaşar Nuri Öztürk and Caner Taslaman. Some believe that there are secret Quranists even in the Diyanet itself.

The Turkish Directorate of Religious Affairs (Diyanet) regularly criticizes and insults Quranists, gives them no recognition and calls them kafirs (disbelievers). Quranists responded with arguments and challenged them to a debate.

Turkey's role in the Islamic World 
Turkey is a founding member of the Organisation of Islamic Cooperation (OIC, formerly the Organisation of the Islamic Conference). The headquarters of some Islamic organizations are located in Turkey:
The Islamic Conference Youth Forum for Dialogue and Cooperation (ICYF-DC) in Istanbul
The Research Center for Islamic History, Art and Culture (IRCICA), in Istanbul, and
The Statistical, Economic and Social Research and Training Centre for Islamic Countries (SESRIC) in Ankara.

See also
Islam in Pakistan
Religion in Turkey
Secularism in Turkey
Minorities in Turkey
Islam by country

Notes

References

Further reading 
 Bein, Amit. Ottoman Ulema, Turkish Republic: Agents of Change and Guardians of Tradition (2011) Amazon.com
 Karakas, Cemal (2007) "Turkey. Islam and Laicism Between the Interests of State, Politics and Society". Peace Research Institute Frankfurt (PRIF), Germany, PRIF-Report No. 78/2007.
 Smith, Thomas W. (2005) "Between Allah and Ataturk: Liberal Islam in Turkey", The International Journal of Human Rights, Vol. 9, No. 3., pp. 307–325.
 Yavuz, M. Hakan. Islamic Political Identity in Turkey (2003) Amazon.com
 Chopra, R.M., Sufism, 2016, Anuradha Prakashan, New Delhi. .
Yavuz, M. Hakan and Öztürk, Ahmet Erdi (2019), "Turkish Secularism and Islam Under the Reign of Erdoğan", Southeast and Black Sea Studies, Vol. 19, NO. 1; https://doi.org/10.1080/14683857.2019.1580828